Eriotheca peruviana is a species of flowering plant in the family Malvaceae. It is found only in Peru.

References

peruviana
Endemic flora of Peru
Trees of Peru
Vulnerable plants
Taxonomy articles created by Polbot